The Red King and the Witch: Gypsy Folk and Fairy Tales is a 1965 anthology of 25 tales that have been collected and retold by Ruth Manning-Sanders. It is one in a long series of such anthologies by Manning-Sanders.

This book was first published in the United Kingdom in 1964, by Oxford University Press.

Table of contents
Brian and the Fox
The Deluded Dragon
The Hen That Laid Diamond Eggs
Bald Pate
Jankyn and the Witch
Sylvester
The Red King and the Witch
The Old Soldier and the Mischief
The Riddle
It All Comes To Light
Jack and His Golden Snuff-Box
The Brigands and the Miller's Daughter
The Little Bull-Calf
The Little Fox
Tropsyn
The Tinker and His Wife
The Little Nobleman
The Snake
The Tale of a Foolish Brother and of a Wonderful Bush
The Black Dog of the Wild Forest
The Dragon and the Stepmother
The Dog and the Maiden
An Old King and His Three Sons of England
The Three Princesses and the Unclean Spirit
Happy Boz'll

Collections of fairy tales
Children's short story collections
Romani fairy tales
1964 short story collections
1964 children's books
1964 anthologies